The 1954 Asian Games (officially known as Second Asian Games – Manila 1954) was a multi-sport event celebrated in Manila, Philippines from May 1 to May 9, 1954. This was the second edition of the Asian Games, in which a total 970 athletes representing 18 Asian National Olympic Committees participated in eight sports divided into 76 events.

Medal table
The ranking in this table is consistent with International Olympic Committee convention in its published medal tables. By default, the table is ordered by the number of gold medals the athletes from a nation have won (in this context, a "nation" is an entity represented by a National Olympic Committee). The number of silver medals is taken into consideration next and then the number of bronze medals. If nations are still tied, equal ranking is given; they are listed alphabetically by IOC country code.

References

Medal table
1954